The A. H. Bulbulian Residence is a house located at 1229 Skyline Drive, Rochester, Minnesota, United States.  Designed by noted architect Frank Lloyd Wright it was completed in 1947 for Arthur H. Bulbulian, a pioneer in the field of facial prosthetics. It is down the street from the Thomas Keys House and not far from the James McBean Residence, all three examples of Wright's Usonian genre of architecture. The Bulbulian Residence is a one-story house built with one 120-degree angle, and is constructed of cement brick and cypress. The house has recently been restored to near-original condition.

References

External links
The Bulbulian House: A New Rochester Skyline ([url=http://www.rochestermagazine.com/the/bulbulian/house/a/new/rochester/skyline/story-318.html Archived] 2011-07-24)
Photographs from 2012.
All-Wright Site - Frank Lloyd Wright Building Guide - Minnesota (Archived 2009-10-24)

Frank Lloyd Wright buildings
Buildings and structures in Rochester, Minnesota
Houses in Olmsted County, Minnesota